Wang Fengge (1895–1937) was born in Tonghua, Jilin, China. In 1914 Wang Fengge graduated from the Donghua Normal School, and had studied traditional martial arts as a young man. In 1922 he was made a company commander in a brigade of the Northeast Army. In 1926 he retired from the army, going into business, and became involved in the Big Swords Society. 

After the Japanese invasion of Manchuria, he raised a volunteer force by linking up with other citizens in the Linjiang and Ji'an areas during late 1931 and announced the establishment of his army—the Northeastern Volunteer Righteous and Brave Fighters—in March 1932.

In April, 1932 Tang Juwu revolted in Huanren, establishing the Liaoning Self-Defense Corps. Wang Fengge's unit and other groups of Big Swords became part of Tang Juwu's force. On May 7, 1932, Wang led his force and with Commander Fang Chun  of the Huinan anti- Japanese force jointly attacked and occupied the Liuho county seat, and proclaimed the revolt against Japan in a circular telegram.  Wang's unit of 1,000 men, suddenly increased to 5,000, and he organized them into six brigades.

By the end of February 1933, most of the large volunteer armies had fled to the Soviet Union, from where they were eventually repatriated. However Wang did not flee and fought on in a guerrilla unit, and continued to harass the Japanese and Manchukuoan forces for many years in Liaoning.  Wang Fengge was captured in 1937 after a three-day battle and was then executed, along with his wife and child.

Sources
Wang Fengge
 The volunteer armies of northeast China

1895 births
1937 deaths
National Revolutionary Army generals from Jilin
Chinese people of World War II
People from Tonghua
Executed Republic of China people
People executed by Japanese occupation forces
20th-century executions by Japan
Executed people from Jilin